Khawarij or Kharijite Rebellion may refer to:
The Najdat revolt in Arabia (684–693)
The Azariqa revolt in Persia (684–698)
The revolt of Shabib ibn Yazid al-Shaybani in Iraq (696–698)
The Berber Revolt in the Maghreb and al-Andalus (739–743)
The rebellion of al-Dahhak ibn Qays al-Shaybani in Iraq (745–746)
The Ibadi revolt in Arabia (747–748)
The rebellion of al-Walid ibn Tarif al-Shaybani in al-Jazira (794–795)
The Zanj Rebellion in Iraq and al-Ahwaz (869–883)
The Kharijite Rebellion in al-Jazira (866–896)